The 2010–11 America East Conference men's basketball season marks the 31st season of America East Conference basketball. The 2011 America East men's basketball tournament will be held for the second straight year at Chase Arena at Reich Family Pavilion in Hartford, Connecticut.

America East Preseason Poll

Conference awards & honors

All-Conference Preseason Teams

Weekly honors
Throughout the conference regular season, the America East offices name a player of the week and rookie of the week each Monday.

America East All-Conference Teams

America East All-Defensive Team

America East All-Freshmen Team

America East All-Academic Team

Player of the Year
John Holland from Boston University was awarded Player of the Year honors in the 2010-2011 season.

Coach of the Year
Mike Lonergan of Vermont was awarded Coach of the Year honors in the 2010-2011 season.

Freshmen of the Year
Brian Voelkel of Vermont was awarded Freshmen of the Year honors in the 2010-2011 season.

Defensive Player of the Year
Brendan Bald of Vermont was awarded Defensive Player of the Year honors in the 2010-2011 season.

Scholar Athlete
Evan Fjeld of Vermont was awarded Scholar Athlete honors in the 2010-2011 season.

References